Eyton is a village and civil parish in Shropshire, England on the south-west edge of the Weald Moors, north of Wellington.

Naturalist Thomas Campbell Eyton (1809-1880) was born at Eyton Hall and owned the Eyton estate from succeeding to it in 1855.

See also
Listed buildings in Eyton upon the Weald Moors

References

Raven, Michael, 'A Guide to Shropshire', Michael Raven, 2005, 0906114349.

Villages in Shropshire
Telford and Wrekin
Civil parishes in Shropshire